Marcus Aemilius Lepidus ( 121 – 77 BC) was a Roman statesman and general. After the death of Lucius Cornelius Sulla, he joined or instigated a rebellion against the government established by Lucius Cornelius Sulla, demanding a consecutive term as consul late in his year and – when refused – marching on Rome. Lepidus' forces were defeated in a battle near the Milvian Bridge and he fled to Sardinia. He was the father of the triumvir Marcus Aemilius Lepidus and of one of the consuls for 50 BC, the other was Lucius Aemilius Lepidus Paullus.

Early career
During the Social War Lepidus fought in northern Italy under Pompeius Strabo, who was consul in 89 BC. He was probably aedile while Sulla was in Greece fighting the First Mithridatic War. In 82 BC, during Sulla's civil war, he fought for Sulla. Some time during Sulla's dictatorship, he held the praetorship. He captured Norba, in Latium, which had sided with Sulla's enemies. Appian wrote that after a long resistance, he was let in the town by treachery. This usually happened when a town could no longer endure a siege. Angered by the betrayal, some inhabitants killed themselves and some set fire to the town. 

Lepidus was the first governor of Sicily under Sulla's regime. This was probably in 81 BC. We do not have any information about what he did when he was there. He had family ties to this province. Two members of his family had been governors in Sicily in 218 BC and 191 BC respectively. Cicero wrote that he had not committed fraud in regard to the grain supply.

Pliny the Elder noted that Lepidus divorced his wife Appuleia. We do not know when this happened. She was related to Lucius Appuleius Saturninus. He enriched himself during Sulla's proscriptions. Pliny the Elder thought that he had the most beautiful house in Rome, with marble thresholds and shields with the battle scenes of Troy.

Consulship
Lepidus was elected as the senior consul for 78 with Quintus Lutatius Catulus as his colleague. Syme believed that there were only two candidates that year, but it is likely that the election was freely contested. According to Plutarch, Pompey supported his election and canvassed for him, against the wishes of Sulla, who did not trust Lepidus. Plutarch's claims about the importance of Pompey's help cannot be taken at face value, due to his "tendency to exaggerate the impact of the major players"; Lepidus' noble ancestry, public work on the basilica Aemilia, and possible bribery (if believing Sallust) certainly also played to his advantage before the electoral comitia. It also is unclear whether Sulla in fact opposed Lepidus' candidature.

During his term, Lepidus exploited the grievances of those who had lost the civil war against Sulla, campaigning against a public of funeral for Sulla, who had died that year, and also for a damnito memoriae on the dictator. However, his consular colleague Quintus Lutatius Catulus, with the support of Pompey, was successful in securing the dictator a lavish public funeral, perhaps out of the interest of the post-Sullan victors to legitimise Sulla's laws and reforms. Lepidus, during his consulship, continued however to agitate for the restoration of confiscated property, re-enfranchisement of those who lost their civil or political rights under Sulla, recall of exiled citizens, and repeal of Sullan legislation. Many of those who had profited or otherwise benefitted from the proscriptions opposed recall of the exiles, who would likely initiate prosecutions against or demand return of property from them.

He also was successful in securing the passage of a lex frumentaria (law providing for the distribution of grain) to the urban plebs. He opposed, however, restoration of the political rights of the tribunes, arguing – in a now lost speech – that restoration would not be in the public interest. He also quarrelled with his colleague over the appointment of an urban prefect.

Lepidus' populist rhetoric "brought results, perhaps even unforeseen results" with an uprising at Faesulae in Etruria where the townsmen attacked the garrisons and colonies of Sulla's veterans. Lepidus and his colleague Catulus were assigned by the senate to deal with the emergency. Gruen remarks explicitly that "evidently the senate did not feel that Lepidus'... pronouncements had compromised him to the point where he could not be sent to stifle an insurrection inspired by his own propaganda". Lepidus had expected to widen his political support after Sulla's death by canvassing with opponents of the dictator, actions which were not seen by the senate as indicative of revolutionary sedition.

Soon after arriving in Etruria, however, the insurgents acclaimed Lepidus as their leader, a position he accepted in the face of mass popular support in the region. Even after Lepidus had sided with the rebels, the senate did not act against him, awarding him the provinces of Gallia Transalpina and Cisalpina by under normal procedures and instructing the two consuls not to engage in conflict with each other. This indicates substantial support for Lepidus from the upper classes. It was only when Lepidus was ordered to return home to conduct consular elections did the senate turn against him: he demanded a consecutive consulship, "a condition which he must have known was unacceptable".

Rebellion
Instead of acquiescing, an interrex was appointed for the purpose of holding elections, in which Mamercus Aemilius Lepidus Livianus and Decimus Junius Brutus were elected consuls. The election result was manipulated, with a competitor of Mamercus Lepidus forced to withdraw candidacy. That said, the result itself ensured a clear public statement, however, that the Aemilii Lepidi and Junii Bruti "would survive the elimination of two rogue individual members".

Early in 77 BC and the new consular term, a senatus consultum ultimum was passed against this Lepidus at the urging of L Marcius Philippus (consul in 91 and former ex-censor), instructing the proconsul Catulus, interrex Ap Claudius Pulcher, and other magistrates to defend the state. His revolt was joined by L Cornelius Cinna the younger (son of the elder Cinna during the civil war), Marcus Junius Brutus (father of the tyrannicide), one M Perperna, and a Scipio; a young Julius Caesar's support was solicited, but he declined.

As "the military quality of Catulus did not inspire confidence", the senate also called upon Pompey to join the cause, giving him an extraordinary command against the rebels.  Pompey, invested as a legate with propraetorial powers, quickly recruited an army from among his veterans and threatened Lepidus, who had marched his army to Rome, from the north. Catulus, who had recruited an army at Rome, now took on Lepidus directly defeating him in a battle north of Rome. Meanwhile, Pompey had penned up Marcus Junius Brutus, one of Lepidus's commanders, in Mutina. Pompey then marched against Lepidus' rear catching him near Cosa, but although he defeated him Lepidus was still able to embark part of his army and retreat to Sardinia.

References
Footnotes

Bibliography 
Ancient sources 
Appian, The Civil Wars, Book 1, Kessinger Publishing, 2009; 
Asconius, Commentaries on Speeches of Cicero (Clarendon Ancient History), Oxford University Press, U.S.A., 1993;  
Florus, Epitome of Roman History (Loeb Classical Library), Loeb, 1929; ASIN: B01A6506H0 
Granius Licinianus, Grani Liciniani Quae Supersunt (Classic Reprint)(in Latin), Forgotten Books, 2018: 
Plutarch, Parallel Lives, Pompey (Loeb Classical Library), Loeb, 1989: 
Sallust, Catiline's War, The Jugurthine War, Histories: WITH The Jugurthine War, Penguin Classics, 2007; 
Modern sources
 
 
 

120s BC births
77 BC deaths
2nd-century BC Romans
1st-century BC Roman consuls
Marcus consul 676 AUC
Populares
Year of birth uncertain